In Greek mythology, the name Bienor (Ancient Greek: Βιήνωρ) or Bianor (Βιάνωρ) may refer to:

Bienor, a Centaur at the wedding of Pirithous and Hippodamia, killed by Theseus in the ensuing battle.
Bienor, a defender of Troy killed by Agamemnon.
Bienor, son of Pyrnus, a soldier in the army of Cyzicus killed in the battle against the Argonauts.
Bianor (or Ocnus), son of Manto (either the daughter of Tiresias, or of Heracles) and the river god Tuscus or Tiberis, founder of Mantua which he named after his mother.

Notes

References 

 Gaius Valerius Flaccus, Argonautica translated by Mozley, J H. Loeb Classical Library Volume 286. Cambridge, MA, Harvard University Press; London, William Heinemann Ltd. 1928. Online version at theio.com.
 Gaius Valerius Flaccus, Argonauticon. Otto Kramer. Leipzig. Teubner. 1913. Latin text available at the Perseus Digital Library.
 Homer, The Iliad with an English Translation by A.T. Murray, Ph.D. in two volumes. Cambridge, MA., Harvard University Press; London, William Heinemann, Ltd. 1924. . Online version at the Perseus Digital Library.
Homer, Homeri Opera in five volumes. Oxford, Oxford University Press. 1920. . Greek text available at the Perseus Digital Library.
 Maurus Servius Honoratus, In Vergilii carmina comentarii. Servii Grammatici qui feruntur in Vergilii carmina commentarii; recensuerunt Georgius Thilo et Hermannus Hagen. Georgius Thilo. Leipzig. B. G. Teubner. 1881. Online version at the Perseus Digital Library.
 Publius Ovidius Naso, Metamorphoses translated by Brookes More (1859-1942). Boston, Cornhill Publishing Co. 1922. Online version at the Perseus Digital Library.
 Publius Ovidius Naso, Metamorphoses. Hugo Magnus. Gotha (Germany). Friedr. Andr. Perthes. 1892. Latin text available at the Perseus Digital Library

Trojans
Centaurs